Estadio Las Gaunas was a multi-use stadium in Logroño, Spain. It was initially used as the stadium of CD Logroñés matches.  It was replaced by the current Estadio Las Gaunas in 2002.  The capacity of the stadium was 14,895 spectators.

External links
Stadium history
Estadios de Espana

CD Logroñés
Las Gaunas
Sports venues completed in 1923
1923 establishments in Spain